The Travel Air 2000/3000/4000 (originally, the Model A, Model B and Model BH were open-cockpit biplane aircraft produced in the United States in the late 1920s by the Travel Air Manufacturing Company. During the period from 1924–1929, Travel Air produced more aircraft than any other American manufacturer, including over 1,000 biplanes. While an exact number is almost impossible to ascertain due to the number of conversions and rebuilds, some estimates for Travel Air as a whole range from 1,200 to nearly 2,000 aircraft.

Design and development

Design and development
The Travel Air Model A was engineered chiefly by Lloyd Stearman, with input from Travel Air co-founders Walter Beech, Clyde Cessna, and Bill Snook and could trace its ancestry back to the Swallow New Swallow biplane. The Travel Air, however, replaced the New Swallow's wooden fuselage structure with a welded steel tube. An interim design, the Winstead Special, was developed by the Winstead brothers from a metal fuselage frame developed at Swallow by Stearman and Walter Beech, but subsequently rejected by Swallow president Jake Moellendick, a decision which triggered the departure of both Stearman and Beech, and the creation of Travel Air. Until the appearance of the all new 12/14/16 series, all subsequent Travel Air biplanes would be derived from the Model A.

The Travel Air biplanes were conventional single-bay biplanes with staggered wings braced by N-struts. The fuselage was fabric-covered welded chromium-molybdenum alloy steel tubes, faired with wooden battens and they had two open cockpits in tandem, with the forward cockpit carrying two passengers side by side.

In common with the Fokker D.VII that they resembled, the rudder and ailerons of the first Travel Air biplanes had an overhanging "horns" to counterbalance the aerodynamic loads on the controls, helping to reduce control forces and making for a more responsive aircraft. These were the distinctive Travel Air "elephant ear" ailerons which led to the airplane's popular nicknames of Old Elephant Ears and Wichita Fokker. Some subsequent models were offered without the counterbalance, providing a cleaner, more conventional appearance with less drag. Pitch forces could be trimmed out with an inflight-adjustable horizontal stabilizer.

Different, interchangeable wings were offered, including a shorter and thinner wing known as the "Speedwing" which improved speed.

A considerable number of engines were installed, including nearly every mass-produced engine in the  range available at the time, and a number of more obscure prototype engines, as can be seen in the list of designation prefixes.

Travel Air entered the specially-modified Model 4000-T in the Guggenheim Safe Aircraft Competition of 1930, but it was disqualified, as were all production aircraft entered during the qualification trials. The Travel Air biplanes were noted for their good flying qualities which may have helped Travel Air outsell all rivals by 1929.

Steam-powered
In 1933, George and William Besler replaced the  usual gasoline powered piston engine in a Travel Air 2000 with an oil-fired, reversible V-twin compounding steam engine, which would become the first airplane to successfully fly using a steam engine.

Operational history
In addition to a wide range of normal aircraft applications, the Travel Air biplanes saw extensive use in early motion pictures, where they often stood in for the increasingly scarce Fokker D.VII.

Aside from surplus military aircraft such as the Curtiss JN-4 Jenny and along with their chief competitor WACO, Travel Air biplanes were the most widely used civilian biplanes during the late 1920s and very early 1930s in America.

Travel Air biplanes were popular as executive transports, and many were purchased by wealthy-sportsmen adventurers who entered them in the competitions and air races that were frequently held during that era. Like many aircraft of the period, they also operated as air taxis and provided air charter services, carrying passengers and light air cargo, and some would find their way north where they worked as bushplanes.
As the supply of war-surplus aircraft declined and they became available on the used aircraft market, many were also used for barnstorming, which included exhibition and stunt flying, and selling rides.
Commercial operators found the Travel Air biplanes to be versatile, owing to their useful payload, rugged construction and (for the times) speed and efficiency.

Towards the end of their career elsewhere, from the late-1930s through the early 1960s, they were increasingly used for the harsh work of bush flying and cropdusting, and Travel Air biplanes were among the most commonly used cropdusters, perhaps second only to surplus Stearman Kaydet biplanes.

Most remaining Travel Air biplanes have been restored, and are in museums, while a small number continue to be used for personal recreation or selling rides and flying at airshows. A 1929 Travel Air normally based in the San Diego area is the oldest regularly flying aircraft tracked by FlightRadar24, an aviation tracking website.  A 1927 Travel Air is regularly used to give sightseeing rides from Orcas Island, Washington.

As the 2000/3000/4000 series was nearing the end of its development cycle, a pair of new designs, the Travel Air 12 and 14 were developed to replace it - the 12 as a slightly smaller two-seat trainer, and the larger 14 as a direct replacement, even to continuing some of the marketing names. Both would fly while Travel Air retained its identity, but would be incorporated into the Curtiss-Wright line with the same numbers.

Movie industry
Travel Air biplanes were widely used in 1920s/1930s war movies, particularly to represent the airplanes they were patterned after: Germany's Fokker D-VII fighter, the top fighter of World War I. In the motion picture industry, they were known as "Wichita Fokkers." In fact, Hollywood's demand for Travel Air biplanes was so intense that Travel Air's California salesman, Fred Hoyt, coaxed Travel Air co-founder and principal airplane designer, Lloyd Stearman, to come to Venice, California in 1926 to exploit the movie industry demand for his aircraft by starting the short-lived independent Stearman Aircraft Company (re-opened back in Wichita in 1927).

Some of the many movies using Travel Air biplanes (2000 and 4000, in particular) included:
 Wings (1927) won the first-ever Academy Award for Best Picture for its technical accuracy 
 Flying Fool (1929) early leading roles for William Boyd, later famous as "Hopalong Cassidy") 
 Hell's Angels (1930) extravagant war epic by Howard Hughes
 The Dawn Patrol (1930)
 Heartbreak (1931)
 Ace of Aces (1933) featured five Travel Air Model Bs, and numerous other aircraft.
 Hell in the Heavens (1933)
 Flying Devils (1933)
 Murder in the Clouds (1934)

Variants
Date from Aerofiles

Early letter designations
Initially Travel Air assigned letters to each type, with a suffix denoting the engine.
Model A1925 Prototype, with WW1 style straight axle.  Curtiss OX-5 water-cooled V-8 engine
Model BSimilar to Model A with a split axle undercarriage, also fitted with a  Curtiss OX-5. Redesignated as 2000.
Model BH1926 Model B powered with a  Hispano-Suiza 8A or Wright model E water-cooled V-8 engine. Redesignated as 3000.
Model BW1926 Model B with a  Wright J-4 9-cylinder radial engine. Redesignated CW-4000

Numerical designation sequences
Variants were distinguished with prefixes and suffixes in a particular order, and denoting different fittings.
The prefix S, preceding all other prefixes meant it was a Seaplane and was fitted with floats.
Next it was wings. B was the Standard wing, not to be confused with the original basic elephant ear wing, and D indicated the aircraft was fitted with a Speedwing.
The engine code followed this, and due to the long service period when considerable experimentation occurred, a wide variety of engines were installed in production airplane as follows:
A -  Axelson B engine 7-cylinder radial engine
B -  Wright J-5 Whirlwind 9-cylinder radial engine
C -  Curtiss Challenger 6-cylinder radial, or Curtiss C-6 inline engine
D -  Aeromarine B 6-cylinder inline engine
E -  Wright J-6-5 Whirlwind 5-cylinder radial engine
J4 -  Wright J-4 Whirlwind 9-cylinder radial engine
K -  Kinner K-5 5-cylinder radial engine
W -  Warner Scarab 7-cylinder radial engine
L -  Lycoming R-680 9-cylinder radial engine
V -  Velie ML-9 9-cylinder radial engine
W -  Warner Scarab S-50 radial 7-cylinder  engine
9 -  Wright J-6-9 Whirlwind 9-cylinder radial engine
Following the engine code in a very small number of cases, M, indicated that it was a single seater configured as a Mailplane, and then the model number. The same system was also used with the later numerical desigation sequence. The sole example of the mailplane seems to have been the BM-4000, a Wright J-5 powered mailplane, of which 7 were built. Not all possible variations were built.
Suffixes were also added that were specific to modifications made and often referred to conversions or post-production versions.

1000 series designations
1000Formerly Model A with  Curtiss OX-5 water-cooled V-8 engine
2000Improved Model B with  Curtiss OX-5 engine. First Travel Air to be Type Certified.
C-2000 -  Curtiss C-6 6-cylinder inline engine
D-2000 - OX-5-powered racing aircraft with reduced-span wings and narrower fuselage. Later converted to Model 11.
S-2000 - Unofficial designation for floatplane version of 2000. Also used for 2000 powered by  Curtiss OXX-6 (twin ignition version of OX-5).
SC-2000 -  Curtiss C-6 powered landplane with undercarriage of B-4000. At least three converted.
2000-T -  Milwaukee Tank V470 air-cooled derivative of OX-5. 15 built. 
3000Improved Model BH with  Hispano-Suiza 8A or Wright model E water-cooled V-8 engine. Estimated 51 built.
D-3000 - Reduced span wings - used for racing. 
4000Three seat aircraft powered by  Wright J-5 or Wright J-4 radial engine.
4000-T -  Wright J-6 Whirlwind radial engine, converted C-4000 for 1930 Safe Airplane competition, Curtiss-built wings
4000-CAM -  Fairchild-Caminez 447 four-cylinder radial engine, also designated 8000 and later Curtiss-Wright CW-8
8000Also designated 4000-CAM,  Fairchild-Caminez 447 X engine, became Curtiss-Wright CW-8
9000  Ryan-Siemens Sh 14 7-cylinder radial engine. Four converted from Travel Air 4000 or 3000. Later designated Curtiss-Wright CW-9

Late numerical sequence
4originally 4000 series
4-B -   Wright J-6
4-D -  Wright J-5, E-4000.
4-P/PT -  ACE LA-1 (later became Jacobs LA-1)
4-S - 4000 with experimental Powell engine
4-U -  Comet 7-D or 7RA 7-cylinder air-cooled radial 
W-4-B - Ted Wells Special Single seat competition aircraft modified from D-4000
Z-4-D - 4-D crop duster with  Wright J-6 Whirlwind
11 Modified D-2000 with Wright J-6 Whirlwind 9-cylinder radial engine and a narrower fuselage for competition 
B-11D:  Wright J-6 Whirlwind, modified 4-D for competition in the National Air Races

Curtiss-Wright designations
CW-8
 Curtiss-Wright designation for Travel Air 8000
CW-9
 Curtiss-Wright designation for Travel Air 9000
CW-11
 Curtiss-Wright designation for Travel Air 11

Operators

Peruvian Air Force - operated at least one Travel Air E-4000 at the start of the Leticia Incident in 1932.

Surviving aircraft and aircraft on display
206 (NC1081) – 2000 at the Golden Age Air Museum in Bethel, Pennsylvania.
490 (NC5290) – 2000 airworthy at the Historic Aircraft Restoration Museum in Maryland Heights, Missouri.
321 (NC3947) – 3000 airworthy at the Historic Aircraft Restoration Museum in Maryland Heights, Missouri.
475 (NC2709) – 4000 airworthy at the Kelch Aviation Museum in Brodhead, Wisconsin.
669 (NC6217) – 2000 static display at the Yanks Air Museum in Chino, California.
720 (CF-AFG) – 2000 on static display at the Canada Aviation and Space Museum in Ottawa, Ontario.
721 (NC6282) – 2000 on static display at the Shannon Air Museum in Fredericksburg, Virginia.
766 (NC6425) – 4000 airworthy at the Cavanaugh Flight Museum in Addison, Texas.
850 (NC9049) – 4000 airworthy with the Western Antique Aeroplane & Automobile Museum in Hood River, Oregon.
1151 (CF-JLW) – D-4D at the Reynolds-Alberta Museum in Wetaskiwin, Alberta.
1340 (NC434N) – D-4D (ex-E-4000) on static display at the National Air and Space Museum in Washington, D.C.
1365 (NC174V) – 4000 airworthy at the Fantasy of Flight in Polk City, Florida.
1379 (NC477N) – D-4000 airworthy at the Owls Head Transportation Museum in Owls Head, Maine.
1224 (NC648H) – E-4000 airworthy at the EAA Aviation Museum in Oshkosh, Wisconsin.
516 (NC5427)  – 4000 airworthy in the United Kingdom

Specifications (OX-5 Travel Air 2000 (ATC 30))

See also

Deland Travel Air 2000, a modern replica of the aircraft

(Partial listing, only covers most numerous types)

Alexander Eaglerock
American Eagle A-101
Brunner-Winkle Bird
Buhl-Verville CA-3 Airster
Command-Aire 3C3
Parks P-1
Pitcairn Mailwing
Spartan C3
Stearman C2 and C3
Swallow New Swallow
Waco 10

List of aircraft
 List of civil aircraft

References

Citations

Bibliography

 
 
  

1920s United States sport aircraft
2000
Steam-powered aircraft
Single-engined tractor aircraft
Biplanes
Aircraft first flown in 1925
Curtiss aircraft